Rå (Norse) – Spirit that protects a specific place
 Rabisu (Akkadian) – Vampiric spirit that ambushes people
 Radande (Swedish) – Tree spirit
 Ragana (Lithuanian) – Malevolent witch
 Raijū (Japanese) – Lightning spirit
 Rain Bird (Native American) – Rain spirit
 Rainbow crow (Lenape) – Crow spirit
 Rainbow Fish (Hindu) – Whale-sized, multi-colored fish
 Rainbow Serpent (Australian Aboriginal) – Snake
 Rakshasa (Buddhist and Hindu) – Shapeshifting demon
 Ramidreju (Cantabrian) – Extremely long, weasel-like animal
 Raróg (Slavic) – Whirlwind spirit
 Raven Mocker (Cherokee) – Life-draining spirit
 Raven Spirit (Native American, Norse, and Siberian) – Trickster spirit
 Ratatoskr (Norse) – Squirrel spirit  
 Raystown Ray (American Folklore) – Possible plesiosaur or serpent
 Redcap (English) – Evil, ugly humanoid
 Re’em (Jewish) – Gigantic land animal
 Reichsadler (Heraldic) – Eagle, sometimes depicted with two heads
 Rephaite (Jewish) – Giant
 Reptilian humanoid (Global) – Human-lizard hybrid
 Revenant (Medieval folklore) – Reanimated dead
 Roc (Arabian and Persian) – Gigantic bird
 Rokurokubi (Japanese) – Long-necked, humanoid trickster
 Rompo (Africa and India) – Skeletal creature with elements of a rabbit, badger, and bear
 Rồng – (Vietnamese) dragon
 Rougarou (French America) – Human-wolf shapeshifter
 Rusalka (Slavic) – Female water spirit
 Ryū – Japanese dragon

R